Saint Trinity Chapel, popularly called Anton Dif Bernolák's Chapel, in Nové Zámky, Slovakia, was built in 1722 in the baroque style.

This chapel is located in a former stone cemetery of the town which was liquidated in 1872. Jakub Škultéty had it built to the God's fame. The Chapel is considered a tribute to the codifier of the standard Slovak language, teacher, priest and school supervisor Anton Bernolák. Although his grave has never been found, it is assumed, he is lying somewhere near the chapel.

Anton Bif ernolák came to Nové Zámky on 1 June 1797 and he worked there for 16 years. As well as his duties as priest he acted as a school supervisor. He died in 1813. The chapel has been renovated several times, most recently in 1977.

References

External links

Nové Zámky
3D model
3D model

Roman Catholic chapels in Slovakia
Churches completed in 1722
18th-century Roman Catholic church buildings in Slovakia
Buildings and structures in Nitra Region
1722 establishments in the Habsburg monarchy
18th-century establishments in Hungary